Sepulcher is the second studio album by the American screamo band Infant Island. It was released without previous announcement on April 17, 2020, through Acrobat Unstable Records, Left Hand Label, and Zegema Beach Records. It was self-produced by the band, with help from Michael Toney of the mathcore band Black Matter Device.

The album was critically acclaimed at the time of its release, often mentioned in conjunction with the band's next album Beneath due to their close release dates. The final listed track, "Awoken," was particularly praised, with music critic Ian Cohen writing in Pitchfork that it was "the kind of stunning, 10-minute scorched-earth aerial view that every screamo band tries to make."

Track listing

Personnel 
Sepulcher personnel adapted from LP liner notes.

Infant Island 

 Daniel Kost – vocals
 Alexander Rudenshiold – guitar, vocals
 Winston Givler – guitar, vocals
 Kyle Guerra – bass, vocals
 Austin O’Rourke – drums

Additional Instrumentation 

 Michael Toney – vocals

Technical Credits 

 Michael Toney – primary engineering, recording, and preliminary mixing
 Kyle Guerra – vocal engineering and recording
 Austin O'Rourke – primary mixing
 Brad Boatright – mastering

Artistic Credits

 Alexander Rudenshiold – layout, design

References 

2020 albums
Infant Island albums